The second season of the musical drama television series Soy Luna was ordered on June 7, 2016, and premiered on Disney Channel Latin America on April 17, 2017—previously scheduled for February 2017—and concluded on September 29, 2017. This season consists of 80 episodes just like the previous season. The Show was broadcast from Monday to Friday at 6:00pm Argentine time. Filming began in June 2016 and wrapped in February 2017. The official trailer dropped on December 31, 2016.

Like the previous season, this season it stars Karol Sevilla, Ruggero Pasquarelli, Valentina Zenere, and Michael Ronda as the titular characters. The season introduces several new cast members, including Estela Ribeiro and Roberto Carnaghi. Luz Cipriota, who used to star in the first season, was written off the series.

Plot summary 
The holidays are over and everyone returns home, a dream functions as a detonator of history, which will lead the protagonists to face new personal challenges, passions, feelings and the search and reaffirmation of one's identity.

Luna (Karol Sevilla) is on her way to revealing truth, while waiting, hopefully, for her reunion with Matteo (Ruggero Pasquarelli). But he comes back changed and reticent. No one knows the secret that Matteo hides. But Luna is ready to fight against wind and tide to discover it.

In his way Luna will help Matteo to discover his true passion and he will have to face the pressure of his demanding father. While in the mansion reigns a tense atmosphere, the arrival of Alfredo (Roberto Carnaghi) father of Sharon (Lucila Gandolfo) alters the routine and brings memories of the past. Luna feels a strong empathy for this funny and mischievous man, who looks so much alike. The relationship between the two, coupled with the help of Nina (Carolina Kopelioff), will mark a new personal path for Luna and help her investigate the mystery of her past. Vocational conflicts affect the group of the greatest. Ámbar (Valentina Zenere), Jazmín (Katja Martínez), Delfi (Malena Ratner), Gastón (Agustín Bernasconi) and Ramiro (Jorge López), who leave Blake South College, must decide which way to take on their journey towards adulthood.

Meanwhile, Matteo will debate between fulfilling the parental mandate, and pursue a prestigious career at the university, or choose what he really loves. Through Ramiro, he will discover a group of street skaters, "Los Adrenaline", who will guide him in the pursuit of his great passion. Beyond school, the popularity of Jam & Roller continues to grow, and the track now has cameras streaming what happens there throughout the day. But an unforeseen event will change the plans and unleash a crisis that will force the whole team to work together and be united. One last great event of the season, where the world of music and skating merge, will mark them forever; some will continue their journey and others will cross again, but all will be marked by the deep friendship that unites them. At the end of the road, Luna is about to discover a truth that will dramatically change her life forever.

Cast

Starring 
 Karol Sevilla as Luna Valente / Sol Benson
 Ruggero Pasquarelli as Matteo Balsano
 Valentina Zenere as Ámbar Smith 
 Michael Ronda as Simón Álvarez

Also starring 
 Malena Ratner as Delfina "Delfi" Alzamendi
 Agustín Bernasconi as Gastón Perida
 Katja Martínez as Jazmín Carbajal
 Ana Jara as Jimena "Jim" Medina
 Jorge López as Ramiro Ponce
 Chiara Parravicini as Yamila "Yam" Sánchez
 Gastón Vietto as Pedro Arias 
 Lionel "Leo" Ferro as Nicolás "Nico" Navarro
 Carolina Kopelioff as Nina Simonetti 
 Estela Ribeiro as Juliana / Marisa Mint
 Lucila Gandolfo as Sharon Benson
 Rodrigo Pedreira as Reinaldo "Rey" Guitierrez
 David Murí as Miguel Valente
 Ana Carolina Valsagna as Mónica Valente
 Roberto Carnaghi as Alfredo Benson
 Diego Sassi Alcalá as Tino
 Germán Tripel as Cato
 Antonella Querzoli as Amanda
 Paula Kohan as Mora Barza
 Ezequiel Rodríguez as Ricardo Simonetti
 Caro Ibarra as Ana Castro

Recurring 
 Sebastián Villalobos as himself
 Samuel Do Nascimento as Santi Owen
 Thelma Fardin as Flor
 Gabriel Calamari as Xabi
 Julieta Nair Calvo as Paula
 Sheila Piccolo as Fernanda
 Sebastián Villalobos as himself
 Candelaria Molfese as Ada/Eva
 Roberto Ottini Ángelo Balsano

Special guest stars 
 Sabrina Carpenter as herself
 Martina Stoessel as herself

Episodes

References 

2017 Argentine television seasons